The 1987 Big League World Series took place from August 15–22 in Fort Lauderdale, Florida, United States. Taipei, Taiwan defeated Broward County, Florida in the championship game.

Teams

Results

References

Big League World Series
Big League World Series